Krstel Petrevski (born 8 April 2001) is an Australian rules footballer who plays for West Coast in the AFL Women's (AFLW).

In 2020, Petrevski made her debut for Melbourne in the 2020 AFLW season semi final against GWS Giants. Petrevski started the 2021 AFLW season kicking two goals in Round 1 against Gold Coast Suns, before a severe hamstring injury ended her season after two games.

In 2021, Petrevski designed the Melbourne AFLW Indigenous guernsey worn against Collingwood in Round 5 of the 2021 AFLW season.  Petrevski was also commissioned to design the Melbourne Storm Indigenous jersey worn in Round 12 against Brisbane Broncos in the 2021 NRL season.

In June 2022, Petrevski was traded alongside Isabella Simmons to West Coast, where she joined her cousin Sam Petrevski-Seton who plays for the AFL side.

References

External links

 

Living people
2001 births
Melbourne Football Club (AFLW) players
Australian rules footballers from Western Australia
Sportswomen from Western Australia
Indigenous Australian players of Australian rules football
Australian people of Macedonian descent